Judy Hunt, MRVCS (born Darwen, 16 April 1957) is an English priest, who served as Archdeacon of Suffolk from 2009 to 2012.

Hunt was educated at the University of Bristol, the Royal Veterinary College, Fitzwilliam College, Cambridge and Ridley Hall, Cambridge. She trained as a vet and was a lecturer in equine veterinary science at the University of Liverpool.

She was ordained deacon in 1991 and priest in 1994. She was a curate in Heswall, and then Priest in charge of Tilston (1995–2003). She was the Bishop of Chester's Advisor for Women in Ministry (1995–2000); a Canon Residentiary at Chester Cathedral (2003–9) and Director of Mission and Ministry from 2003 until her appointment as Archdeacon. She has been Rector of St Alkmund's Church, Whitchurch, Shropshire since 2012.

References

1957 births
People from Darwen
Archdeacons of Suffolk
Alumni of the University of Bristol
Alumni of the Royal Veterinary College
Alumni of Fitzwilliam College, Cambridge
Alumni of Ridley Hall, Cambridge
Academics of the University of Liverpool
English veterinarians
Living people